The Communist League was a grouping of the Left Opposition in Brazil, formed in 1931, operating within the Brazilian Communist Party (PCB) and which gave rise, in 1934, to the Internationalist Communist League, an organization formed by Mario Pedrosa, Lívio Xavier, Fúlvio Abramo, Aristides Lobo, Benjamin Péret, Rodolfo Coutinho, Wenceslau Escobar Azambuja, among other PCB activists and union members such as Joaquim Barbosa (PCB secretary for union affairs), João Costa Pimenta (trade union veteran, grandfather of Rui Costa Pimenta, who in the future would be leader of the Workers' Cause Party, Leonel Pessoa (former cadet, expelled from the Army for participating in the Vaccine Revolt in 1904, who at the time worked as a graphic worker), João Dalla Dea (graphic worker).

History
As Mario Pedrosa, a Communist Party activist, describes, when he was traveling to take a political training course in the Soviet Union in 1929, in Germany he came into contact with Leon Trotsky's criticisms of the policy implemented by the Communist International. Later, through an intense correspondence with Lívio Xavier, he informed Brazilian militants of the existing differences. Mário returned to Brazil in July 1929 and first organized the Lenin Communist Group (GCL). In January 1931, the members of the GCL founded the Communist League (LC), the Brazilian section of the International Left Opposition.

References

Bibliography
 
 

1931 establishments in Brazil
1934 disestablishments in Brazil
Communist parties in Brazil
Defunct political parties in Brazil
Political parties established in 1931
Political parties disestablished in 1934
Trotskyist organisations in Brazil